Preben De Man (born 27 September 1996) is a Belgian footballer who plays as a left winger for Belgian Division 2 club Dikkelvenne.

Career
On 31 January 2022, De Man joined Belgian Division 2 club Dikkelvenne, coming over from league rivals Lokeren-Temse.

References

External links

Preben De Man at Footballdatabase

1996 births
Living people
Belgian footballers
K.S.C. Lokeren Oost-Vlaanderen players
Belgian Pro League players
Association football midfielders
Belgium youth international footballers
People from Dendermonde
Footballers from East Flanders
S.C. Eendracht Aalst players
Belgian National Division 1 players